James Asheton Bayard Jr. (November 15, 1799 – June 13, 1880) was an American lawyer and politician from Delaware.  He was a member of the Democratic Party and served as U.S. Senator from Delaware.

Early life 

Bayard was born in Wilmington, Delaware on November 15, 1799. He was a son of Nancy (née Bassett) Bayard and James A. Bayard, a member of the Federalist Party who served as U.S. Representative and U.S. Senator from Delaware.  His older siblings included brother Richard H. Bayard, also a U.S. Senator from Delaware, and Ann Caroline Bayard, who operated the Bayard family's ironworks, Victoria Furnace, with their brother Henry Milligan Bayard.

His paternal grandparents were Dr. James Asheton Bayard and Ann (née Hodge) Bayard. The Bayard family was descended from a sister of Director-General Petrus Stuyvesant and came to Bohemia Manor, Cecil County, Maryland in 1698.  His maternal grandfather was Richard Bassett, a signatory to the United States Constitution and U.S. Senator from Delaware.

Career
Bayard studied the law, and began his legal practice in the city of Wilmington. From 1836 until 1843 he served as United States Attorney for Delaware. In 1851 he was elected to the U.S. Senate. He was re-elected in 1857 and 1863, and served from March 4, 1851, to January 29, 1864, when he resigned. As U.S. Senator he was chairman of the Committee on Engrossed Bills in the 32nd Congress, a member of the Committee on Public Buildings in the 33rd Congress and 34th Congress, a member of the Committee on Judiciary in the 35th Congress and 36th Congress, and a member of the Committee on Public Buildings and Grounds in the 35th Congress.

Bayard served on the boards of various railroads, including the Wilmington and Susquehanna Railroad, the Philadelphia, Wilmington and Baltimore Railroad (for which service he is named on the 1839 Newkirk Viaduct Monument), and the Pennsylvania Railroad.

In 1846, Bayard represented slave owners in a civil suit against Thomas Garrett, a Wilmington iron merchant who was also a "stationmaster" on the Underground Railroad. The plaintiffs demanded damages from Garrett for helping around 10 slaves escape to freedom. The suit was tried in the U.S. District Court in New Castle, Delaware, before Chief Justice of the Supreme Court Roger B. Taney (sitting as a circuit judge). (Taney later issued the notorious Dred Scott decision as Chief Justice.) Bayard won a judgement that all but bankrupted Garrett, who declared on the spot that he would redouble his anti-slavery efforts: "Friend, I haven't a dollar in the world, but if thee knows a fugitive who needs a breakfast, send him to me."

Bayard was a conservative and adhered to his interpretation of tradition throughout the American Civil War.  He believed the South should be allowed to secede peacefully, and privately hoped for the secession of Delaware and a state convention to address the issue. Citing property rights of owners, he opposed abolitionist measures. He also stated both his opposition to the Civil War and his opposition to any presidential or congressional acts used to suppress the independence of the Southern states.

During the Civil War, the Senate required all senators to swear an oath of loyalty to the Union. Bayard refused, stating that such an oath would be unconstitutional, and after taking the oath and giving a long speech disputing its legality, resigned from the Senate.

The death of his successor, George R. Riddle, on March 29, 1867, left the Senate seat vacant. Bayard interrupted his practice of law in Wilmington and accepted appointment to the vacant seat. He was subsequently elected to fill it, and served again from April 5, 1867, to March 3, 1869.  During the impeachment trial of President Andrew Johnson, Bayard voted "not guilty." After declining to run again for re-election, he returned to private practice for several years until poor health incapacitated him.

In 1872, he was among the nine politicians whose names were submitted by the House of Representatives to the Senate for investigation in the Credit Mobilier scandal. He wrote a letter disavowing any knowledge of the affair, and his name was generally dropped from the investigation.

Personal life
On July 8, 1823, Bayard was married to Anne Francis (1802–1864) by the Right Rev. Bishop William White. Anne was the daughter of Thomas Willing Francis and Dorothy (née Willing) Francis and granddaughter of Thomas Willing, the first president of First Bank of the United States.  Anne's elder sister, Elizabeth Francis, was the second wife of their cousin, U.S. Senator from Rhode Island, John Brown Francis. Together, they were the parents of:

 James Asheton Bayard (1825–1848), who died unmarried.
 Mary Ellen Bayard (1827–1845), who married Augustus Van Courtlandt Schermerhorn (1812–1846), son of Abraham Schermerhorn.
 Thomas Francis Bayard (1828–1898), a U.S. Senator who married Louise Lee, daughter of Josiah Lee and Elouise Sewell. After her death, he married Mary Willing Clymer, the granddaughter and namesake of the Philadelphia socialite Mary Willing Clymer.
 Charles Carroll Bayard (1829–1850), who died from a wound received during the eruption of Mount Vesuvius on February 9, 1850.
 George Harrison Bayard (1832–1836), who died in childhood.
 Mabel Bayard (1838–1897), who married Dr. John Kintzing Kane Jr. (1833–1886), son of Judge John K. Kane, in 1863. After his death, she married Levi Clark Bird (1842–1902).
 Florence Bayard  (1842–1898), who married Benoni Lockwood IV (1834–1909).

His wife died on March 11, 1864.  Bayard died at Wilmington on June 13, 1880, and is buried there in the Old Swedes Episcopal Church Cemetery.

Descendants
Through his son Thomas, he was a grandfather of U.S. Senator Thomas Francis Bayard Jr., who married Elizabeth Bradford du Pont, and was the father of five, including Alexis I. du Pont Bayard, the Lieutenant Governor of Delaware from 1949 to 1953.

Almanac
Senators were elected by the state legislature at this time – in this case the Delaware General Assembly – to a six-year term beginning March 4. Bayard was elected to a term beginning March 4, 1863, but resigned in 1864. George R. Riddle was appointed to serve the rest of the term, but died in 1867. Bayard was then appointed to serve the remainder of the term.

References
Notes

Bibliography

External links
Biographical Directory of the United States Congress
Delaware’s Members of Congress

The Political Graveyard

Delaware Historical Society
University of Delaware

1799 births
1880 deaths
James A. Jr.
People from Wilmington, Delaware
Delaware lawyers
People of Delaware in the American Civil War
Democratic Party United States senators from Delaware
Delaware Democrats
Union College (New York) alumni
United States Attorneys for the District of Delaware
19th-century American politicians
19th-century American lawyers
19th-century American Episcopalians